Marcel Raymond Theroux (born 13 June 1968) is a British-American novelist and broadcaster. He wrote A Stranger in The Earth and The Confessions of Mycroft Holmes: A Paper Chase, for which he won the Somerset Maugham Award in 2002. His third novel, A Blow to the Heart, was published by Faber in 2006. His fourth, Far North, was published in June 2009. His fifth, Strange Bodies, was published in May 2013. He has also worked in television news in New York City and in Boston.

He is the elder son of the American travel writer and novelist Paul Theroux and his then-wife Anne Castle. His younger brother, Louis Theroux, is a journalist, documentarian, and television presenter.

Early life
Marcel Theroux was born in 1968 in Kampala, Uganda, where his American father, Paul Theroux, was teaching at Makerere University. His mother is Anne Castle, an Englishwoman. The family spent the next two years in Singapore, where his father taught at the National University of Singapore. After their move to England, Theroux was brought up in Wandsworth, London. After attending a state primary school, he boarded at Westminster School where his best friend was Nick Clegg. He went on to study English literature at Clare College, Cambridge. He won a fellowship to study International Relations with a specialisation in Soviet and East European Studies at Yale University.

He lives in Tooting, London, and is married. His paternal French surname originates from the region around Sarthe and Yonne in France. It is quite common in francophone countries and is originally spelled Théroux. His father, born and raised in the United States, is of half French Canadian and half Italian descent.

Career

From 2000 to 2002, Theroux presented a series of documentaries for Unreported World.

In 2004 he presented The End of the World as We Know It, part of the War on Terra television series about climate change on Channel 4. He was chosen as presenter because he originally knew nothing about the subject. He initially believed that all environmentalists were opposed to technological progress. But during his research, he became convinced that the world faced a global problem on a scale so serious that an expansion of nuclear energy is probably the best solution (choosing the lesser evil). He reached this conclusion partly in response to his interviews with several experts, such as Gerhard Bertz of the insurance agency Munich Re, who said that during the past 20 years, payments for natural disasters have increased by 500 percent. He also interviewed Royal Dutch Shell chairman Lord Ron Oxburgh. A PR assistant interrupted them. Oxburgh's negative views on the consequences of current oil consumption were likely considered detrimental to the corporation's image.

In March 2006 Theroux presented Death of a Nation on More4, as part of The State of Russia series. In the programme he explored the country's post-Soviet problems, including population decline, the growing AIDS epidemic, and the persecution of the Meskhetian Turks. During interviews in the programme, he spoke simple Russian.
On 28 September 2008 he presented Oligart: The Great Russian Art Boom on Channel 4, exploring the role of Russia's rich in keeping Russia's art history alive by buying and exhibiting domestic art.

In March 2009, Faber and Faber published Theroux's Far North, a future epic set in the Siberian taiga.

On 16 March 2009, Theroux presented In Search of Wabi-sabi on BBC Four, as part of the channel's 'Hidden Japan' season of programming. Theroux travelled and reported from Japan to explore the aesthetic tastes of Japan and its people.

In 2012, Theroux presented a documentary for Unreported World Series 23, on the subject of street children in Ukraine.

His novel Strange Bodies won the 2014 John W. Campbell Memorial Award.

In 2017, Theroux presented a documentary for Unreported World which explored the social and economic consequences of the recent rise in Orthodoxy and Russian nationalism under Vladimir Putin.

In 2020, Theroux presented a documentary for Unreported World which explored middle-aged, single Japanese men's obsession with 'Junior Idols' and whether it was a quirk in Japanese culture or something more sinister.

Bibliography

References

External links 
 
 Interview on Meet The Writers, Monocle 24 with Georgina Godwin
 "Russia's rise in conservative family values - Unreported World 2017

1968 births
Living people
English television personalities
21st-century English novelists
British people of French-Canadian descent
English people of American descent
English people of French descent
English people of French-Canadian descent
English people of Italian descent
People educated at Westminster School, London
Alumni of Clare College, Cambridge
People from Kampala
People from Wandsworth
English male novelists
Marcel
21st-century English male writers